Sumpter is an unincorporated community in Bradley County, Arkansas, United States. It is situated at 243 feet (74 metres) above mean sea level. Sumpter is one of the many small towns in Bradley County that has decayed to nearly nothing since the collapse of the logging industry in the early 1930s.

References

Unincorporated communities in Arkansas
Unincorporated communities in Bradley County, Arkansas